Wilhelm Duschinsky (6 May 1860 – 28 August 1924) was an Austrian philologist, educator, and writer.

Biography
Duschinsky was born in Strasnitz, Moravia, on 6 May 1860. He attended the gymnasium in Vienna, and afterward studied Romanic and Germanic philology at the Universities of Vienna and Paris.

Besides numerous monographs, he published a number of essays in the Archiv für neuere Sprachen und Literatur, the Zeitschrift für österreichische Gymnasien für das Realschulwesen, and the journal Österreichische Mittelschule.

Publications

References
 

1860 births
1924 deaths
19th-century Austrian Jews
19th-century Austrian male writers
20th-century Austrian Jews
20th-century Austrian male writers
Austrian educators
Austrian Empire Jews
Jewish educators
Linguists of Germanic languages
Moravian Jews
Romance philologists
University of Paris alumni
University of Vienna alumni